Coteaux du Blanzacais is a commune in the department of Charente, southwestern France. The municipality was established on 1 January 2017 by merger of the former communes of Blanzac-Porcheresse (the seat) and Cressac-Saint-Genis. On 1 January 2019, the former commune of Saint-Léger was merged into Coteaux du Blanzacais.

See also 
Communes of the Charente department

References 

Communes of Charente

Communes nouvelles of Charente
Populated places established in 2017
2017 establishments in France